Løyndbreen ("The Hidden Glacier") is a glacier in Nathorst Land at Spitsbergen, Svalbard. It has a length of about four kilometers, situated between the mountains of Bassøefjellet and Langlifjellet, and extending towards the valley of Bromelldalen.

References

Glaciers of Spitsbergen